The Low Countries derby, is the name given in football to any match between Belgium and the Netherlands. The countries have a long-standing tradition of rivalry in football, having played over 125 official derbies so far. Only Austria–Hungary and Argentina–Uruguay have been contested more often. Not only have the Low Countries met 19 times in the framework of major tournaments, they have also played at least 35 friendly cup duels.

All Low Countries derbies

The full official record between the two countries is as follows:

Correct as of 3 June 2022.

Belgium vs Netherlands Cups

From their first friendly derbies onwards, Belgium and the Netherlands competed for floating trophies. During the encounters in Belgium the teams played for the Coupe Vanden Abeele until 1925, and in the friendlies in the Netherlands they played for the Rotterdamsch Nieuwsblad Beker until 1923, for a total of 39 Belgian-Dutch friendly cup matches (of which 35 official internationals). The cup awarded in Belgium was named after and initially handed out by Frédéric Vanden Abeele Sr., father of the secretary of Beerschot Athletic Club (where the tournament took place). As the Dutch disliked the design of this Belgian cup, they quickly nicknamed it Het Koperen Dingetje, meaning "The Copper Thingy".

See also
Belgium national team rivalries
Belgium–Netherlands relations
Germany–Netherlands football rivalry

Footnotes

References

Bibliography
  (Extract consulted online on 30 August 2010 on Beerschot Athletic Club)

International association football rivalries
History of the Belgium national football team
History of the Netherlands national football team
Belgium–Netherlands relations